Phebe is a feminine given name related to Phoebe. It may refer to:

 Phebe Bekker (born 2005), British ice dancer 
 Phebe Gibbes (died 1805), English novelist and early feminist
 Phebe Ann Coffin Hanaford (1829-1921), Christian Universalist minister, biographer and activist for universal suffrage and women's rights
 Phebe Hemphill (born 1960), American sculptor who works for the United States Mint
 Phebe or Phoebe Lankester (1825-1900), British botanist and popular science writer
 Phebe Marr (born 1931), American historian and retired professor
 Phebe Novakovic (born 1957), American businesswoman, Chairwoman and Chief Executive Officer of General Dynamics
 Phebe Starr, Australian singer and songwriter
 Phebe Sudlow (1831-1922), first female superintendent of a United States public school and first female professor at the University of Iowa
 Phebe Watson (1876-1964), South Australian teacher and educator

Fictional characters
 Phebe, in Shakespeare's play As You Like It
 Phebe, in the 17th century play A Mad Couple Well-Match'd by Richard Brome

Feminine given names